USS Sailfish has been the name of more than one United States Navy ship, and may refer to:

, originally named USS Squalus (SS-192), a submarine in commission in 1939 and again from 1940 to 1945
, later SS-572, a submarine in commission from 1956 to 1978

United States Navy ship names